Joseph Gerard Christopher (July 26, 1955 – March 1, 1993) was an American serial killer who gained infamy for a series of murders in the early 1980s. He is believed to have killed at least twelve African American men and boys and wounded numerous others.

Early life
Joseph Gerard Christopher was born in Buffalo, New York on July 26, 1955, as the only son born to Therese (née Hurley) and Nicholas Christopher. His mother was a registered nurse, and his father was a maintenance worker with the city's Sanitation Department.  Joseph had two older sisters and one younger sister. Nicholas was an outdoorsman and hunter who taught Joseph how to shoot and handle weapons at a young age; according to friends, Joseph had a passion for the outdoors which exceeded all of his other interests.

He enrolled in the automotive mechanics program at Burgard Vocational High School in 1971. He was remembered as a quiet student who did well in his shop courses before dropping out in early 1974, and was said to be "very intelligent, though he wasn't book-smart."  He then worked a series of odd jobs before securing employment as a maintenance man at Canisius College, where he shared a midnight shift with a co-worker. He was fired in March 1979 for sleeping on the job and returned to live with his parents.

Christopher, who had paranoid schizophrenia, reached out for assistance after noticing his mental health slipping in 1978.  He tried to admit himself to the Buffalo Psychiatric Center in September 1980. The Psychiatric Center staff told him he was not a danger to himself or others and so could not be admitted. This was a common practice at a time when such centers were being downsized. Instead, the center officials recommended counseling therapy. Fourteen days after he left the center, the killings began.

Murders

Christopher's murder spree began on September 22, 1980, when he killed three black men and one boy in the space of 36 hours with a .22 caliber sawed-off Ruger 10/22 semi-automatic rifle concealed in a brown paper bag. These murders led to the media epithet of the .22-Caliber Killer. A 14-year-old boy, Glenn Dunn, was the first victim, shot outside a supermarket in Buffalo on September 22.  Harold Green, 32, was shot the next day while dining at a fast food restaurant in Cheektowaga. That same evening in Buffalo, 30 year old Emmanuel Thomas was shot while crossing the street to his home, only 7 blocks away from Glenn Dunn's murder. On September 24, Joseph McCoy was shot to death in Niagara Falls.

He committed two more murders on October 8 and October 9, both times bludgeoning his victims to death and then cutting their hearts out. The bloodied, beaten, and mutilated body of 71 year old Parler Edwards was found in the trunk of his taxi cab parked in Amherst on October 8. Forty-year-old Ernest Jones was found in similar condition beside the Niagara River in Tonawanda on October 9. Jones' blood-spattered taxi was found 3 miles away in Buffalo.

Collin Cole, 37, was attacked in a Buffalo hospital on October 10. A white man matching the description of the .22 Caliber Killer tried to strangle him to death.  Cole said the man snarled, "I hate niggers" at him before trying to kill him. He was saved by the arrival of a nurse, and though severe damage had been done to his throat, he survived the attack.

These initial murders went unsolved at first, and Christopher enlisted in the United States Army in November, and was stationed at Fort Benning. He soon received Christmas furlough and arrived in Manhattan on December 20, where, on December 22, he committed four more murders and two more attacks; this time stabbing his victims to death, thus earning the moniker of the Midtown Slasher. Twenty-five year old John Adams was stabbed at around 11:30 a.m., but survived. About two hours later, 32 year old Ivan Frazier was attacked. He managed to deflect the blade with his hand, suffering only minor injuries. Luis Rodriguez, 19, was the first murder of the day; at around 3:30 p.m., he was stabbed to death. At 6:50 p.m., 30 year old Antone Davis was stabbed to death. Around 4 hours later, 20 year old Richard Renner was stabbed and killed. Finally, Carl Ramsey was stabbed with a knife while on the subway at around 11 p.m., and died from his injuries before midnight.

Christopher then returned to Buffalo and fatally stabbed another black man, 31-year-old Roger Adams, on December 29 and 26-year-old Wendell Barnes in Rochester on December 30.  He committed three additional attacks in Buffalo on New Year's Eve and New Year's Day (Albert Menefee, Larry Little, and Calvin Crippen), but all three victims survived. Christopher then returned to Fort Benning in January 1981.

When back at Fort Benning, Christopher attacked a fellow black soldier with a paring knife in what was described as an unprovoked attack on January 18. The soldier survived the attack and Christopher was placed in the fort's  stockade, where he attempted suicide by cutting himself with a razor. In a subsequent psychiatric session, he told a psychiatrist that he "had to" kill blacks. This admission caused Christopher's home to be searched by the police. There the police found evidence linking Christopher to three murders, which led to his indictment in April 1981 and his transfer back to Buffalo for his trial on May 8.

Victims

Trial, imprisonment and death

He pleaded not guilty to the three murders and refused counsel by lawyers hired by his mother, opting instead to represent himself. He was subsequently found guilty and sentenced to 60 years in prison, but this ruling was overturned as the trial judge had barred the defense from presenting expert psychiatric testimony about Christopher's ability to stand trial. He was later found competent to stand trial, and appeared in court again in 1985 under various charges which led to him being sentenced to life imprisonment. While imprisoned at the Attica Correctional Facility, Christopher claimed that he committed 13 killings. He died in prison due to a rare form of male breast cancer on March 1, 1993, at the age of 37.

Media coverage
The Discovery Channel cable network television show The FBI Files first aired its Joseph Christopher investigation, on May 9, 2000, titled the ".22 Caliber Killer".

See also 
 List of serial killers in the United States
 List of serial killers by number of victims

References

External links
 State of New York v. Joseph G. Christopher (07/05/85)

1955 births
1980 murders in the United States
1993 deaths
20th-century American criminals
American people convicted of murder
American people who died in prison custody
American male criminals
American murderers of children
American serial killers
American spree killers
American white supremacists
Deaths from cancer in New York (state)
Deaths from male breast cancer
Male serial killers
People from Buffalo, New York
People with schizophrenia
Prisoners who died in New York (state) detention
Racially motivated violence against African Americans
Serial killers who died in prison custody
Violence against men in North America